The 1977 winners of the Torneo di Viareggio (in English, the Viareggio Tournament, officially the Viareggio Cup World Football Tournament Coppa Carnevale), the annual youth football tournament held in Viareggio, Tuscany, are listed below.

Format
The 16 teams are seeded in 4 groups. Each team from a group meets the others in a single tie. The winner of each group progress to the final knockout stage.

Participating Teams
Italian teams

  Fiorentina
  Genoa
  Inter Milan
  Lazio
  Milan
  Napoli
  Perugia
  Sampdoria
  Verona

European teams

  Dukla Praha
  Eintracht Frankfurt
  Rangers
  Wisła Kraków
  Hajduk Split
  Újpesti Dózsa
  Amsterdam

Group stage

Group A

Group B

Group C

Group D

Knockout stage

Champions

Footnotes

External links
 Official Site (Italian)
 Results on RSSSF.com

1977
1976–77 in Italian football
1976–77 in Yugoslav football
1976–77 in Dutch football
1976–77 in Polish football
1976–77 in Scottish football
1976–77 in Czechoslovak football
1976–77 in German football
1976–77 in Hungarian football